The Theban Tomb known as MMA 60 is located in Deir el-Bahari. It forms part of the Theban Necropolis, situated on the west bank of the Nile opposite Luxor. The tomb is the burial place several high ranking individuals dating to the 21st Dynasty.

People buried in MMA 60
 Djedmutesankh A - Chief of the Harem of Amun.
 Henuttawy B - Daughter of Pinedjem I and Duathathor-Henuttawy
 Henuttawy C - Chief of the Harem of Amun, Flutist of Mut, and God's Mother of Khonsu, probably a daughter of the Theban High Priest of Amun Menkheperre and of Isetemkheb C
 Menkheperre C - God's Father, Priest of Amun-Re, son of Fai-en-Mut, grandson of Piankh
 Ankhesmut
 Tabeketmut
 Nesenaset  - Chantress of Amun
 Tiye - Chantress of Amun
 Gautsoshen A - Chief of the Harem of Montu. Buried in Pit 4. Daughter of the High Priest Menkheperre and wife of Tjanefer A.

The original burial was for the three ladies Djedmutesankh A, Henuttawy B and Henuttawy C. The tomb was later reopened and the Priest of Amun Menkheperre was buried alongside the three women. The tomb would continue to be reopened and further burials would be made, including Tabeketmut and Ankhesmut.

See also 
 List of MMA Tombs

References 

Theban tombs